True wireless may refer to:

 The True Wireless, a 1919 article by Nikola Tesla; see World Wireless System
 Wireless wide area network
 True wireless headphones